In enzymology, a chondroitin 6-sulfotransferase is an enzyme that catalyzes the chemical reaction

3'-phosphoadenylyl sulfate + chondroitin  adenosine 3',5'-bisphosphate + chondroitin 6'-sulfate

Thus, the two substrates of this enzyme are 3'-phosphoadenylyl sulfate and chondroitin, whereas its two products are adenosine 3',5'-bisphosphate and Chondroitin 6-sulfate.

This enzyme belongs to the family of transferases, specifically the sulfotransferases, which transfer sulfur-containing groups.  The systematic name of this enzyme class is 3'-phosphoadenylyl-sulfate:chondroitin 6'-sulfotransferase. Other names in common use include chondroitin 6-O-sulfotransferase, 3'-phosphoadenosine 5'-phosphosulfate (PAPS):chondroitin sulfate, sulfotransferase, and terminal 6-sulfotransferase.  This enzyme participates in chondroitin sulfate biosynthesis and glycan structures - biosynthesis 1.

References

 

EC 2.8.2
Enzymes of unknown structure